Valentina is a 2008 Argentinian traditionally animated romantic-comedy film released in theaters throughout Argentina, Mexico, and Uruguay on July 24, 2008. It also had a limited release in the United States later that year. It did very poorly at the foreign and international box-office, resulting a box-office bomb. It stars Florencia Otero, as the voice of Valentina, and Sebastián Francini, as the voice of Fede. It  is also Illusion Studios' first feature film.

Plot
Valentina is being told the story of how her grandmother got her first kiss Valentina dreams about her first kiss and how she'll fall in love without a doubt just like her grandmother said the next day at school new kid  Mati catches the eyes of Valen and soon asks her out to a party though one of friends Fede try's to ask her out though doesn't have the courage when Mati asked her to a party they go but soon Valen soon realizes what a jerk he really is and when fedes  cousin shows up thinking he's her girlfriend she realizes he's the one he should have been with at the bonfire for the end of spring Valen confesses her feeling for fedes and tells her his girlfriend is just his cousin  they kiss and Valens girlfriends sing a song Spanish style and Valens puppy barks happily

Cast
Florencia Otero as Valentina
Sebastián Francini as Fede
Lucila Gómez as Sammy
Natalí Pérez as Andy
Gastón D' Angelo as Nacho
Nicolás Maiques as Lucas
Mariano Chiesa as Matías/Director/Dark
Jimena Domínguez as Lucero
Luciana Falcón as Abuela/Maestra
Valeria Gómez as Mamá de Fede

Release
It opened in various theaters throughout Argentina, Mexico and Uruguay on July 10, 2008.

Box office
This film opened at #11 on its opening weekend, earning $72,835 pesos ($340,782 USD). It became a box office failure at the foreign and international box office. It grossed $631,182 worldwide.

See also
Illusion Studios

References

External links

2008 films
Argentine romantic comedy films
Argentine animated films
2000s Argentine films